Kattuputhur is a Panchayat town in the Tiruchirappalli district of the Indian state of Tamil Nadu.

Kattuputhur is known for several Hindu temples.

Population 
The 2001 Census of India reported that Kattuputhur had a population of 11,115 (5,546 male and 5,569 female). Around 10% (1058 individuals) of the population was under one year old (552 male and 536 female).

Industry 

The main occupational sector in the town is agriculture. Kattuputhur has some of the most fertile lands in the Kaveri delta of Tamil Nadu. Rice and bananas are grown alternately throughout the year, reliant on water from the Kaveri delta, mainly flowing  from Kattuputhur. Water from the Kaveri delta is made available to Kattuputhur and surrounding villages through canals branching out from the main river.

Many small canals provide water for the agriculture-dependent inhabitants. The Mayanur Check Dam south of Kattuputhur was built for irrigation purposes.

The nearest Railway Station is Mayanoor. The town has a bus stop, police station, government hospital, library, and a number of banks including Lakshmi Vilas Bank, Indian Overseas Bank, Trichy District Central Co-Operative Bank, Kattuputhur Co-Operative Bank, and the State Bank of India. The Kattuputhur branch of the State Bank of India had the town's first ATM.

Kattuputhur has a primary health center.

Internet and telecommunication service providers that cover the area include BSNL, Airtel, Aircel, Reliance, Vodafone, Tata Docomo, and Idea.

Transport 
Travel to Kattuputhur may done by bus, taxi, or car. Kattuputhur is connected to nearby towns such as Trichy, Karur, Chennai, and Namakkal via government or private buses. Salem and Trichy are equidistant to Kattuputhur.

Temple

Prasanna Venkatesa, a Hindu temple dedicated to Lord Vishnu, is located at Kattuputhur village near Thiru Narayana Puram in the Trichy District of Tamil Nadu. The presiding Deity of the temple is Prasanna Venkatesa Perumal with Sridevi and Bhoodevi Thaayars. The Temple is around 300 years old.

Shops and Establishment 

 RGMS Stores, previously Raja Stores, started on 1993. 
 Ramalingam Stores
 SSS Stores
 Muruganandham Stores
 Kanna Stores
 Aanandha Lakshmi Textiles
 Nagappa Textiles
 RGMS Departmental Stores, started on 14 January 2021. This is the first supermarket to be opened in Kattuputhur.

References

Villages in Tiruchirappalli district